Hermanus "Herman" Nak (6 September 1895, Amsterdam – 31 August 1972, Amsterdam) was a Dutch boxer who competed in the 1920 Summer Olympics. In 1920 he was eliminated in the first round of the lightweight class after losing his fight to Frederick Grace.

References

External links
 list of Dutch boxers

1895 births
1972 deaths
Lightweight boxers
Olympic boxers of the Netherlands
Boxers at the 1920 Summer Olympics
Boxers from Amsterdam
Dutch male boxers